Amirabad is a union in Chittagong Division, Bangladesh. It is located at 22°54'18N 91°27'32E at an altitude of 0 metres.

Demography 
As of 2011, the population of Amirabad Union was 37,303.

References

Populated places in Chittagong Division